The 1962 United States Senate special election in Kansas took place on November 6, 1962, to elect a U.S. Senator to complete the unexpired term of Senator Andrew Frank Schoeppel, who died on January 21, 1962. Former State Senator James B. Pearson was appointed on January 31, 1962, by Governor John Anderson Jr. to fill the vacancy until a special election could be held.

Pearson won the special election, defeating Democratic nominee Paul L. Aylward.

Primary elections
Primary elections were held on August 7, 1962.

Democratic primary

Candidates
Paul L. Aylward, attorney

Results

Republican primary

Candidates
Edward F. Arn, former Governor of Kansas
James B. Pearson, incumbent U.S. Senator

Results

General election

Results

See also 
 1962 United States Senate elections

References

Bibliography
 
 

1962 Special
Kansas Special
United States Senate Special
Kansas 1962
Kansas 1962
United States Senate 1962